The Play-offs of the 2004 Fed Cup Asia/Oceania Zone Group I were the final stages of the Group I Zonal Competition involving teams from Asia and Oceania. Using the positions determined in their pools, the nine teams faced off to determine their placing in the 2004 Fed Cup Asia/Oceania Zone Group I, the top two countries of each pool played for first to fourth placings, while the bottom two of each pool competed for sixth to ninth. The teams that ended up placing first overall advanced to World Group play-offs, whilst those coming in eighth were relegated down to Group II for the next year.

Promotion play-offs
The first and second placed teams of each pool were placed against each other in two head-to-head rounds. The winner of the rounds advanced to the World Group play-offs, where they would get a chance to advance to the World Group for next year.

Thailand vs. India

New Zealand vs. Indonesia

Fifth
As there was only four teams from Pool A as opposed to the five from Pool B, the third-placed team from Pool B had no equivalent to play against. Thus the South Koreans were automatically allocated fifth place.

Relegation play-offs
The last and second-to-last placed teams of each pool were placed against each other in two head-to-head rounds. The losing team of the rounds were relegated to Group II for next year.

China vs. Uzbekistan

Philippines vs. Chinese Taipei

Final Placements

  and  advanced to the World Group Play-offs. The Thai were drawn against , and they won 3–2. The Indonesians were drawn against , and they also were victorious 4–1. Both teams thus competed in the 2005 World Group.
Thus, they both achieved advancement back to Group I for 2006.

See also
Fed Cup structure

References

External links
 Fed Cup website

2004 Fed Cup Asia/Oceania Zone